Kevin Seed (born 27 July 1968) is an English radio DJ. He is most notable for presenting the Radio City Breakfast Show from 1997 to 2008.

Biography

Seed first joined Radio City in 1990. Two years later, he moved to the Preston-based station Rock FM for five years. There he exasperated the Labour leader Tony Blair by asking him if he picked his nose, and which supermodel he would choose to have a one-night stand with if he thought he could get away with it. Blair replied, “That’s enough, Kev.”

In 1997, he re-joined Radio City and presented The Kev Seed Breakfast Show for 11 years before moving to the Drivetime show (4pm–7pm) in August 2008.  He presented the early evening Drivetime show on the Liverpool radio station Radio City 96.7 until October 2008, when he was suspended and then sacked after pleading guilty to a drink-driving charge.  Although he appealed, it was reported on 11 November that the station management had upheld their decision.  In October 2009, Seed started his new job as the Breakfast Presenter for Wish FM, the Radio Station for Wigan & St Helens, a year after leaving Radio City.  He later presented on 107.6 Juice FM. As of 2014, he is voice of Sainsbury's on various radio stations.

In April 2016, it was announced he would be joining the presenting line-up at Wirral Radio with producer Josef Hollywood, hosting the flagship weekend show.

On 27 July 2020, Seed hosted the first ever breakfast show at Liverpool Live 24/7.

References
Specific

General
Kev Seed's profile at WishFM.net

1968 births
Living people
English radio DJs
Radio City DJs
Radio presenters from Liverpool